Marie-André-Alfred-Émile Raunié, (18 November 1854 in Gruissan – 28 September 1911) was a French historian.

A graduate ès lettres, Raunié passed the archivist-paleographer diploma in 1878 with his thesis, Les Institutions municipales de Narbonne au Moyen-âge (1229-1508).

Later on, he was redactor at the ministry of public instruction.

Bibliography 
 1879 - Études administratives : le dépôt légal.
 1879–1884 - Chansonnier historique du XVIIIe siècle. (Recueil Clairambault-Maurepas), 10 volumes. Read vol. 1, 2, 3, 4, 5, 6, 7, 8, 9, and 10
 1881 - Souvenirs et correspondance de Madame de Caylus. Read online,  Prix Archon-Despérouses of the Académie française
 1884 - Mémoires et réflexions sur les principaux évènements du règne de Louis XIV, par le marquis de La Fare.
 1888 - La réforme de l'instruction nationale et le surmenage intellectuel. Read online
 1890–1899 - Épitaphier du vieux Paris Read online. 3 volumes, dans l'Histoire générale de Paris.

Sources 
 Chronique Bibliothèque de l'École des chartes. Volume 72, 1911, (pp. 725–726)

References

External links 
 Émile Raunier on the site of the Académie française

People from Aude
1854 births
1911 deaths
École Nationale des Chartes alumni
19th-century French historians
20th-century French historians